The Luschka's crypts are mucous membrane indentations of the inner wall of the gall bladder. They are named after german anatomist Dr. Hubert Von Luschka.

See also
 Foramina of Luschka
 Luschka's joints
 Ducts of Luschka

References

Hepatology